not to be confused with Ankilimivory
 
Ankilimivony is a village on the southwest coast of Madagascar.  It is located along the road from Anakao in the north and Ankiririsa to the southwest. The main part of the village is located about a mile inland but there is also a coastal fishing settlement.

References

Populated coastal places in Madagascar
Populated places in Atsimo-Andrefana